Chue Lay (born San Thaw Tar; 5 October 1993), formerly known as Nay Inzara is a Burmese television and film actress of ethnic Rakhine descent who gained popularity after starring in the several MRTV-4 series. She has been nominated the Best Supporting Actress at the 2018 Myanmar Academy Awards for her performance in film Sign of Moe Pan Pwint.

Early life and education
Chue Lay was born on 5 October 1993 in Thandwe, Rakhine State, Myanmar. She is the eldest child among two siblings, having a younger brother. She attended high school at Basic Education High School No. 4 Insein. She graduated from University of West Yangon with a degree in English.

Career

2012–2013: Acting debut 
In 2012, she started her career as a contestant in the new face actor choice contest "Pyaw Shwin Sayar Tha Yoke Saung Kabar" (Happy Acting World). Then she signed for five-year contract with MRTV-4 as their actress. She made her acting debut in the film Kyal Taeyar Tike Pwe (Star War), together with students from acting training class. She then starred in the films In Tin Tin Gwin, alongside Geib Wai Yan, and Twist, alongside Pyay Ti Oo.

2014: Breakthrough and rising popularity
In 2014, she starred in her debut series Forever Mandalay, where she played the main role with Aung Min Khant, Han Lin Thant, Aung Yay Chan, and May Me Kyaw Kyaw, aired on MRTV-4 in February 2014. The series gained great success in series history in Myanmar. She then starred in her second television drama Pan Nu Thway Season 2, aired on MRTV-4 in 2014 and which received positive reviews for her portrayal of the character Chue Lay, which led to increased popularity for her. And later, she changed her name Nay Inzara into Chue Lay.

2015–present: Breaking into the big screen and success
In 2015, she portrayed the female lead in her debut big-screen film Sign of Moe Pan Pwint, alongside Han Lin Thant and May Myint Mo. The film was premiered in Myanmar cinemas on 14 September 2018, which earned her a nomination for the 2018 Myanmar Academy Award for Best Supporting Actress.

Then she had to play in several series; Lu Yee Chun (Sophisticated Person) in 2015, Po Ywae Hla Thaw Ma Net Phyan (Prettier Tomorrow) and Kan Kan Ei A Kyo in 2016, Yatha Mawkun Alinkar, Shwe Phoo Sar Sone Yar Myay (The Land of Real Love) and Happy Beach: Season 2 in 2018, Chit Ya Par Thaw Nway (Lovely Chit Nway) and Nway Lel Nya Ye La Min (The Moon in Mid-summer Night) in 2019. She also played in some films like Kyaw Kyar A Mhwe Sein Wi Nyin and Bar Nyar Bar Nyar in 2019, Thaung Tike Ka Kyar Say Thar (May the Universe Hear It) in 2020. Now she is preparing for her next series Tharaphu (The Crown), a famous novel by Khin Hnin Yu.

Filmography

Film
 Kyal Taeyar Tike Pwe (ကြယ်တာရာတိုက်ပွဲ) (2012)
 In Tin Tin Gwin (အင်တင်တင်ဂွင်) (2013)
 Twist (2013)
 Kout Kyaung Myinn Pyaing (ကောက်ကြောင်းမျဉ်းပြိုင်) (2014)

Film (Cinema)

Television series

References

External links 

1993 births
Living people
21st-century Burmese actresses
People from Rakhine State